Disgraced may refer to:

 Disgraced!, a 1933 American pre-Code mystery film
 Disgraced, a 2012 play by novelist and screenwriter Ayad Akhtar
 Disgraced (2017 film), an Emmy Award-winning Showtime documentary on the 2003 murder of Baylor University basketball player Patrick Dennehy

See also 

 Disgraced In America, a song on the 2018 Room Inside the World album by Canadian art punk band, Ought
 Disgrace (disambiguation)